East Candia is an unincorporated community in the town of Candia in Rockingham County, New Hampshire.

The village, as the name suggests, is located in the eastern part of the town of Candia, close to the town border with Raymond.

East Candia has a separate ZIP code (03040) from the rest of the town of Candia.

See also
 New Hampshire Historical Marker No. 237: East Candia: The Langford District / Candia: One Town, Five Villages

References

Unincorporated communities in New Hampshire
Unincorporated communities in Rockingham County, New Hampshire
Candia, New Hampshire